Treaty of Amity and Commerce may refer to:
 Treaty of Amity and Commerce (United States–France) (1778)
 Treaty of Amity and Commerce (United States–Dutch Republic), a 1782 United States treaty
 Treaty of Amity and Commerce (United States–Sweden) (1783)
 Treaty of Amity and Commerce (Prussia–United States) (1785)
  Treaty of Amity and Commerce (United States-Siam) or Siamese-American Treaty of Amity and Commerce (1833)
  Treaty of Amity and Commerce (U.K.-Siam) or Bowring Treaty  (1855)
  Treaty of Amity and Commerce (U.K.-Japan) or Anglo-Japanese Treaty of Amity and Commerce (1858)
 Treaty of Amity and Commerce (France-Japan) (1858)
 Treaty of Amity and Commerce (United States–Japan) or Harris Treaty (1858)
 Treaty of Amity and Commerce (Prussia–Japan) (1861)
  Treaty of Amity and Commerce (United States-Joseon/Korea) or Joseon-American Treaty of Amity and Commerce (1882)
 Treaty of Amity and Commerce (China-Macau) or Sino-Portuguese Treaty ceding (1887)
  Treaty of Amity and Commerce (United States-Korea) or Korean-American Treaty of Amity and Commerce (1897)

See also
 Jay Treaty or Treaty of Amity, Commerce, and Navigation, Between His Britannic Majesty and the United States of America, a 1794 treaty between the United States and Britain
 Sino-Philippine Treaty of Amity (1947)
 Treaty of Amity and Economic Relations (Thailand–United States)  (1966)
 Treaty of Friendship